Alexandre "Alex" Pallarés Piquer (born 26 May 1979) is a Spanish football manager, currently in charge of Bilbao Athletic.

Career
Born in Barcelona, Catalonia, Pallarés moved to Valencia at early age. After suffering an injury at the age of 19 while playing for CD Onda, the club offered him to coach the under-17 squad while recovering. He subsequently retired and started a managerial career.

Subsequently, Pallarés continued to work in the youth categories, having spells at Villarreal CF, Aspire Academy, Levante UD, FC Rubin Kazan and Al Jazira Club. On 23 May 2016, he was named manager of Venezuelan side Atlético Venezuela for the remainder of the season.

On 24 November 2016, after finishing second in the Clausura and helping his side qualify to the 2017 Copa Sudamericana, Pallarés resigned due to personal reasons. He returned to the club the following 30 May, but left on a mutual agreement on 21 March 2018.

On 23 May 2018, Pallarés was appointed Deportivo Táchira manager, but resigned on 20 November, again due to personal reasons. On 3 July of the following year, he took over UD Los Barrios in his country's Tercera División, but resigned on 9 January 2020.

On 6 October 2020, Pallarés was named at the helm of CF Gandía in the regional leagues. He was sacked on 25 November, after only one win in six matches, and returned to South America the following 5 January to take over Real Potosí; on 8 February, however, he had to step down due to health issues.

Pallarés returned to Táchira on 24 December 2021, in the place of Juan Domingo Tolisano. He left on a mutual agreement the following 19 August.

On 22 November 2022, Pallarés returned to his home country after being named manager of Bilbao Athletic in the Primera Federación.

References

External links

1979 births
Living people
Sportspeople from Barcelona
Spanish football managers
Primera Federación managers
Tercera División managers
CF Gandía managers
Athletic Bilbao B managers
Venezuelan Primera División managers
Deportivo Táchira F.C. managers
Club Real Potosí managers
Spanish expatriate football managers
Spanish expatriate sportspeople in Venezuela
Spanish expatriate sportspeople in Bolivia
Expatriate football managers in Venezuela
Expatriate football managers in Bolivia